The National Rifle Association of Pakistan is the governing body to develop and promote the sport of shooting in Pakistan.

The federation was formed in 1986. Lt. Gen. (R) Alam Jan Mehsud served as its first president.

Affiliations 
The NRAP is affiliated with:
 International Shooting Sport Federation
 Asian Shooting Confederation
 Pakistan Olympic Association
 Pakistan Sports Board

Affiliated associations 
The following bodies are associated with NRAP:

 Balochistan Rifle Association
 KP Rifle Association
 Punjab Rifle Association
 Sindh Rifle Association
 Federal Rifle Association
 Pakistan Air Force
 Pakistan Army Rifle Association
 Pakistan Navy

References

Sports governing bodies in Pakistan
National members of the Asian Shooting Confederation
1986 establishments in Pakistan
Sports organizations established in 1986
Rifle associations